Strela (arrow) is a Russian orbital carrier rocket, derived from the Soviet/Russian UR-100NU missile. It conducted its maiden test launch on 5 December 2003, carried its first functional payload on 27 June 2013, and a second one on 19 December 2014.

Strela was originally planned to be launched from the Svobodny Cosmodrome, with test launches being conducted from existing UR-100 silos at the Baikonur Cosmodrome. Svobodny was closed in 2007, without seeing any Strela launches. It is unclear whether a Strela launch complex will be incorporated into the Vostochny Cosmodrome, which is being built on the site of Svobodny.

Strela differs from the Rockot, which is also derived from the UR-100, in that it has undergone fewer modifications, such as the absence of an additional Briz-KM upper stage, as used on the Rockot. However it is equipped with a repurposed APB as upper stage, which was designed to deliver nuclear warheads. It is also launched from silos, whereas the Rockot is launched from flat pads.

Launch history

See also
 Comparison of orbital launchers families
 Comparison of orbital launch systems
Dnepr rocket

References

Space launch vehicles of Russia
Universal Rocket (rocket family)
Vehicles introduced in 2003